Mark Schubert is an American swim coach and was USA Swimming's National Team head coach from June 2006 until November 2010. He took a paid leave of absence from his role with USA Swimming in September 2010, and was later terminated from his position. He returned to coach again with the Mission Viejo Nadadores, but in early 2022 departed with some pro swimmers to coach at SET. As of late 2022, Coach Schubert went to coach swimmers in China.

Prior to this position, he served as the head coach for both the University of Southern California men's and women's swim teams. He previously coached at the University of Texas from 1989 to 1992 where he coached NCAA champions such as Leigh Ann Fetter and Whitney Hedgepeth. During his career, his teams have won three NCAA Championships and 49 NCAA individual titles. His first head coaching job was in 1972 with Cuyahoga Falls High School in Ohio. Previously he was a graduate assistant coach with the University of Kentucky's men's team, helping guide them to their most successful season in history up to that time.’

He has also served as one of the USA's Olympic Swimming Team coaches in: 1980 (which the USA did not attend), 1984, 1988, 1992, 1996, 2000, and 2004. He also was part of the team staff for the 2008 Olympics.

Schubert was the head coach of the Mission Viejo Nadadores, of Mission Viejo, California, where his teams won a total of 44 national championship titles over 13 years. Schubert was also the head coach for the Mission Bay Makos in Boca Raton, Florida, where his teams won 9 national team titles. In 2011, Schubert joined Golden West Swim Club in Huntington Beach, California. In 2016, he returned to the Mission Viejo Nadadores as head coach after a transition period as co-head coach with retiring head coach Bill Rose. Rose – head coach since the early 1990s – was greatly liked and respected during his tenure. Schubert's motive is to once again guide the Nadadores to continuing international success.

He has coached many swimming greats such as Shirley Babashoff, Brian Goodell, Mike O'Brien, Janet Evans, Tiffany Cohen, Cynthia Woodhead, Lenny Krayzelburg, and Jill Sterkel. More recent swimmers include Jarett Maycott, Lindsay Benko, Jessica Hardy, Erik Vendt, Larsen Jensen, Ous Mellouli, Bernard Mendez, Kristine Quance, Lightle Lightle, Jackypus Neton, Barney Barnhill, Khoa Tran, Squidder Rouse, Dara Torres and Kaitlin Sandeno.

In 1997, he was inducted into the International Swimming Hall of Fame (ISHOF) as an Honor Coach.

See also
 List of members of the International Swimming Hall of Fame

References

External links
 Schubert's bio from USC 

Year of birth missing (living people)
Living people
American swimming coaches
College swimming coaches in the United States
USC Trojans swimming coaches
Texas Longhorns swimming coaches